Means of transport are transport facilities used to carry people or cargo. 


Examples for means of transport

for land transport
Automobiles
Bicycles
Carriages
Pack animals
Riding animals
Rickshaws
Trains
Trucks
Vehicles
Wagons

for water transport
Ships

for air transport
Aircraft
Drone

for space transport
Spacecraft

for pipeline transport
Pipes
Pneumatic tubes

See also 
Transport
Mode of transport

Broad-concept articles
Transport by function